Hypostomus margaritifer is a species of catfish in the family Loricariidae. It is native to South America, where it occurs in the upper and middle Paraná River basin. The species reaches  in total length and is believed to be a facultative air-breather. It is known to be syntopic with other loricariid species in the genus Hypostomus, including Hypostomus ancistroides, H. denticulatus, H. heraldoi, H. iheringii, and H. regani. 

Hypostomus margaritifer appears in the aquarium trade, where it is typically referred to as the yellow-spotted hypostomus.

References 

margaritifer